Piz Plavna Dadora is a mountain in the Sesvenna Range of the Alps, located south of Tarasp in the canton of Graubünden. It overlooks the Val Plavna on its west side.

References

External links
 Piz Plavna Dadora on Hikr

Mountains of the Alps
Mountains of Graubünden
Mountains of Switzerland